White City bus station serves the White City area of west London and Westfield London shopping centre.

The bus station was opened on 29 November 2008 to serve the new Westfield London shopping centre. The station has been built around the Grade II listed Dimco Buildings, originally the power station for the Central London Railway, which date from 1898.

The bus station is 100 metres away from Wood Lane tube station on the Circle and Hammersmith & City lines.

The following services serve the bus station: 31, 49, 148, 207, 228, 237, 260, 316, 607 and C1.

See also
List of bus and coach stations in London

References

External links

 Getting to Westfield London by Bus

Bus stations in London
Transport in the London Borough of Hammersmith and Fulham
Bus station